Anna Kristensen (born 25 October 2000) is a Danish handball player who plays for Team Esbjerg and the Danish national team.

She also represented Denmark in the 2017 European Women's U-17 Handball Championship, 2018 Women's Youth World Handball Championship, and in the 2019 Women's Junior European Handball Championship, placing 6th all three times.

She made her debut on the Danish national team on 21 March 2019.

Achievements 
Damehåndboldligaen:
Silver Medalist: 2021
Bronze Medalist: 2020

Individual awards 
 Best Goalkeeper of Damehåndboldligaen: 2019/20
 Player of the Year Viborg HK: 2020
 All-Star Goalkeeper of Damehåndboldligaen: 2019/2020, 2020/2021
 Youth player of the Year in Damehåndboldligaen: 2019/2020, 2020/21

References

2000 births
Living people
Danish female handball players
People from Skanderborg Municipality
Viborg HK players
Sportspeople from the Central Denmark Region